Robert Lowe (1811–1892) was a British statesman.

Robert Lowe may also refer to:
 Rob Lowe (born 1964), American actor
 Robert Lowe (athlete) (born 1945), British Paralympian
 Robert Lowe (musician), American singer of the bands Solitude Aeturnus and Candlemass
 Robert Aiki Aubrey Lowe a.k.a. Lichens (musician) (born 1975)
 Robert Lowe (Austrian footballer)
 Robert Lowe (English footballer), English footballer
 Robert Daniel Lowe (born 1985), English stage, television and film actor
 Bobby Lowe (1865–1951), American baseball player around the turn of the 20th century
 Bobby Lowe (karateka) (1929–2011), American Kyokushin karate practitioner

See also
 Robert Low (disambiguation)
 Robert Loe (born 1991), New Zealand basketball player
 Bob Lowes (born 1963), Canadian ice hockey coach
 Robert Lowes (1902–1985), English footballer
 Robert Lowes (weightlifter) (1904–1968), English Olympic weightlifter